David Morgan (November 8, 1849 – May 11, 1912) was an American judge who served as a justice of the Supreme Court of North Dakota from 1901 to 1911.

Early life and education
Morgan was born on November 8, 1849 in Coalport, Ohio. At a young age, he moved to the state of Wisconsin with his parents. He attended common schools there, being educated at Spring Green Academy and Plattville State Normal School. He also took a year-long special course at Wisconsin State University.

Career
After leaving Wisconsin State University, Morgan taught school in Ironton, Wisconsin. He served later as a principal of a school in Chilton.

Morgan was elected to serve as the Sauk County clerk of court. During his terms in this position, he read law with a number of judges. He was then admitted to practice law in 1879.

In 1881, Morgan resigned as clerk of court, moving to practice law in the Dakota Territory. In 1883, he moved to Devil's Lake, where he served for four years as the state's attorney or Ramsey County. He, thereafter, served for eleven years as a judge of the District Courts of North Dakota.

After his eleven years on the state's district courts, Morgan was elected in 1900 to the North Dakota Supreme Court. He entered the bench at the age of 51, and served for roughly ten years and eight months before resigning on August 31, 1911 due to poor health. After he retired, he moved to California where he died on May 11, 1912 at the age of 61.

References

External links
North Dakota Supreme Court biography

Justices of the North Dakota Supreme Court
North Dakota state court judges
1849 births
1912 deaths
19th-century American judges
People from Middleport, Ohio
University of Wisconsin alumni
American school principals
Educators from Wisconsin
Wisconsin lawyers
People from Sauk County, Wisconsin
District attorneys in North Dakota